The 2015–16 Belgian Cup, called the Croky Cup for sponsorship reasons, is the 61st season of Belgian's annual football cup competition. The competition began on 24 July 2015 and ended with the final in March 2016. The winners of the competition will qualify for the 2016–17 UEFA Europa League Group Stage. Club Brugge were the defending champions.

Competition format
The competition consists of ten rounds. The first seven rounds are held as single-match elimination rounds. When tied after 90 minutes in the first three rounds, penalties are taken immediately. In rounds four to seven and the quarterfinals, when tied after 90 minutes first an extra time period of 30 minutes are played, then penalties are taken if still necessary. The semifinals will be played over two legs, where the team winning on aggregate advances. The final will be played as a single match.

Teams enter the competition in different rounds, based upon their 2014–15 league affiliation. Teams from the fourth-level Promotion or lower began in Round 1. Third Division teams entered in Round 3, with Second Division teams joining in the following round. Teams from the Belgian First Division enter in Round 6.

First round
This round of matches was played on 24, 25 & 26 July 2015  and includes teams of levels 4 to 8 in football league pyramid. Four teams from the lowest division participated, namely KFC Heultje, Korbeek Sport, K. Flandria Dorne and CS Wépionnais. Only CS Wépionnais advanced to become the lowest-ranked team in the second round.

Second round
These round of matches were played on 1 and 2 August 2015. No new teams entered at this round, CS Wépionnais from the 8th level was the lowest ranked team but was eliminated in this round.

Third round
This round of matches was played on 7, 8 and 9 August 2015. Teams playing in the Belgian Third Division joined at this stage except for K.V. Woluwe-Zaventem who were given a bye to the fourth round. Lowest ranked teams in this round were Sportief Rotselaar and K. Zwaluwen Olmen playing at level 7 of the football pyramid.

Fourth round
This round of matches was played on 15 and 16 August 2015. Teams playing in the Belgian Second Division joined at this stage. Lowest ranked team in this round was KFC Merelbeke playing at level 5 of the football pyramid.

Fifth Round
This round of matches was played on 22 and 23 August 2015. Lowest ranked team in this round was KFC Merelbeke playing at level 5 of the football pyramid.

6th Round
These round of matches were played on September 22 and 23. All 16 Belgian Pro League teams entered at this round and received seed status, allowing them to avoid each other. Lowest ranked team in this round was Spouwen-Mopertingen playing in the Belgian Fourth Division.

7th Round
The draw was made on 23 September 2015 and the matches took place on 1, 2 and 3 December 2015. Antwerp from the Belgian Second Division was the only team not playing in the Belgian Pro League still present at this stage.

Quarter-finals
In contrary to previous years, the quarter-finals will be single leg ties. The draw was made on 3 December 2015 and the matches will be played on 16 and 17 December 2015.

Semi-finals
The draw for the semi-finals was made on 17 December 2015, immediately after the end of the match between Standard and Kortrijk. The semi-finals will be played over two legs, with the first legs played on 20 and 21 January 2016 and the second legs on 2 and 3 February 2016.

First legs

Second legs

Final

The final took place on 20 March 2016 at the King Baudouin Stadium in Brussels.

Footnotes

References

Belgian Cup seasons
Belgian Cup
Cup